Cyperus niveus is a species of sedge that is native to parts of Africa, the Middle East and Asia.

See also 
 List of Cyperus species

References 

niveus
Plants described in 1788
Flora of Afghanistan
Flora of Bangladesh
Flora of Benin
Flora of Botswana
Flora of Burkina Faso
Flora of South Africa
Flora of Burundi
Flora of Cameroon
Flora of the Central African Republic
Flora of China
Flora of the Republic of the Congo
Flora of Djibouti
Flora of Eritrea
Flora of Ethiopia
Flora of Gabon
Flora of Ghana
Flora of Guinea
Flora of India
Flora of Iran
Flora of Ivory Coast
Flora of Kenya
Flora of Madagascar
Flora of Malawi
Flora of Peninsular Malaysia
Flora of Myanmar
Flora of Namibia
Flora of Nepal
Flora of Nigeria
Flora of Oman
Flora of Pakistan
Flora of Rwanda
Flora of Saudi Arabia
Flora of Senegal
Flora of Somalia
Flora of Sudan
Flora of Tanzania
Flora of Thailand
Flora of Tibet
Flora of Togo
Flora of Uganda
Flora of Vietnam
Flora of Yemen
Flora of Zambia
Flora of Zimbabwe
Flora of the Democratic Republic of the Congo
 Taxa named by Anders Jahan Retzius